Dermorphin is a hepta-peptide first isolated from the skin of South American frogs belonging to the genus Phyllomedusa. The peptide is a natural opioid that binds as an agonist with high potency and selectivity to mu Opioid receptors. Dermorphin is about 30–40 times more potent than morphine but theoretically may be less likely to produce drug tolerance and addiction (due to its high potency).  The amino acid sequence of dermorphin is H-Tyr-D-Ala-Phe-Gly-Tyr-Pro-Ser-NH2.

Dermorphin is not found in humans or other mammals and similar D-amino acid peptides have only been found in bacteria, amphibians and molluscs. Dermorphin appears to be made in these through an unusual posttranslational modification carried out by an amino acid isomerase. This unusual process is needed because the D-alanine in this peptide is not among the 20 amino acids coded for in the genetic code and thus the peptide cannot be synthesized in the usual way from the encodings in the genome of an organism.

Illicit use 
Dermorphin has been illegally used in horse racing as a performance-enhancing drug.  Due to dermorphin's painkilling activity, horses treated with dermorphin may run harder than they would otherwise.

See also 
 Deltorphin
 Deltorphin I

References

Mu-opioid receptor agonists
Opioid peptides